The name Dora has been used for thirteen tropical cyclones worldwide: two in the Atlantic Ocean, seven in the Eastern Pacific Ocean, one in the Western Pacific Ocean, one in the South-West Indian Ocean and two in the Southwest Pacific Ocean.

Atlantic:
 Tropical Storm Dora (1956) – moved across the southern Bay of Campeche.
 Hurricane Dora (1964) – Category 4 major hurricane, made landfall near St. Augustine, Florida, with winds of 110 mph (175 km/h).
The name Dora was retired after the 1964 Atlantic hurricane season, and was replaced by Dolly for the 1968 season.

Eastern Pacific:
 Hurricane Dora (1981)
 Tropical Storm Dora (1987)
 Hurricane Dora (1993)
 Hurricane Dora (1999) (T9911, 07E) – long-lived hurricane in the Eastern, Central, and Western Pacific basins; did not affect land.
 Tropical Storm Dora (2005) – moved parallel to the Mexican coast near Acapulco.
 Hurricane Dora (2011) – moved parallel to the Mexican coast of Baja California Sur.
 Hurricane Dora (2017) - moved parallel to the Mexican coast. 

Western Pacific:
 Typhoon Dora (1947) (T4719)

South-West Indian:
 Cyclone Dora (2007)

Southwest Pacific:
 Cyclone Dora (1964)
 Cyclone Dora (1971)

Atlantic hurricane set index articles
Pacific hurricane set index articles
Pacific typhoon set index articles
South-West Indian Ocean cyclone set index articles
Australian region cyclone set index articles